Jasper Mall is a 2020 American documentary film directed by Bradford Thomason and Brett Whitcomb. It revolves around the Jasper Mall, a dying mall in Jasper, Alabama.

Synopsis
Jasper Mall often revolves around Mike McClelland, a former zookeeper, who serves as the mall's superintendent and works in a security and caretaking role. The mall, which opened in 1981, has recently lost two of its anchors, Kmart and JCPenney. As a result, foot traffic has declined and the parking lot is often barren. The only remaining anchor store is Belk and according to one shopper, "If Belk goes, we are in deep woo-woo."

The film also follows the day-to-day operations of the remaining 20 or so store owners with a focus on the slowdown of customers. The mall's frequent visitors including groups of mall walkers and domino players are also frequently shown. Also chronicled are events hosted by the mall such as a carnival, visits from Santa Claus and an ensemble of singers.

Towards the end of the film, more shops including Subway, Grady's Sandwich Shop, Robin's Nest Flowers & Gifts and Jewelry Doctor all close or move.

Release
Jasper Mall premiered at January 27, 2020, at the Slamdance Film Festival and to the general public on June 23, 2020.

Production
Jasper Mall was co-directed and co-produced by Bradford Thomason and Brett Whitcomb. Cinematography was also directed by Whitcomb. The Jasper Mall was chosen as the site of the film because it had not been remodeled since it opened in 1981. The film was shot throughout 2018 and McClelland would alert the directors about any events that were occurring at the mall. Thomason and Whitcomb would often sit in the food court and wait for a scene to develop. The soundtrack contains a collection of songs by the musicians HAHA Mart, Chayse Porter, and Baker Knight. The soundtrack was released on vinyl and cassette via the Alabama-based independent record label Earth Libraries.

Reception 
On the review aggregator website Rotten Tomatoes, the film has an approval rating of 88% based on eight reviews, with an average rating of 7.5/10.

Ethan Brehm of Spoiler Magazine named it the best film of the year.

Awards
The film was nominated for the Grand Jury Prize at the Slamdance Film Festival and won the Best Alabama Film award at the Sidewalk Film Festival.

References

External links

 
 Official trailer
 From dying to living: How one nonprofit reimagined vacant Jasper Mall space - Alabama NewsCenter

2020 films
2020 documentary films
American documentary films
Documentary films about Alabama
Films set in Alabama
2020s English-language films
2020s American films